Benedetto Vincenzo Nicotra (5 April 1933 – 21 October 2018) was an Italian politician.

Biography 
A native of Lentini born on 5 April 1933, Nicotra studied law and began his career as a lawyer in 1956. He assumed several political positions on the municipal and regional levels before serving on the Chamber of Deputies from 1983 to 1994, as a member of Christian Democracy.

References

1933 births
2018 deaths
Christian Democracy (Italy) members of the Chamber of Deputies (Italy)
20th-century Italian lawyers
People from Lentini
Deputies of Legislature IX of Italy
Deputies of Legislature X of Italy
Deputies of Legislature XI of Italy